James Percival Winterbotham (21 June 1883 – 2 December 1925) was an English cricketer. He played for Gloucestershire and Oxford University between 1902 and 1904. He was born and died in Cheltenham. Winterbotham was a left-handed batsman and a slow left-arm orthodox spinner.

References

1883 births
1925 deaths
English cricketers
Gloucestershire cricketers
Oxford University cricketers
Sportspeople from Cheltenham
Alumni of Oriel College, Oxford